Breakout Labs is a grant-making body operating as part of the Thiel Foundation (a philanthropic organization created by Peter Thiel). Breakout Labs gives grants for early-stage scientific research that is too speculative or long-term to interest the for-profit sector (such as angel investors and venture capitalists) but may be unsuitable for traditional sources of funding for scientific research due to its radical or offbeat nature. Grants are made through a competitive application and selection process.

Recipients

Breakout Labs announced its first batch of grantees on April 17, 2012, its second batch of grantees on August 15, 2012, and its third batch of grantees in April 2013. The full list of grantees is on the Breakout Labs website.

Goals

Shifting the focus to innovation

Peter Thiel has proposed a dichotomy between:

 Intensive growth, which involves the creation of radical new technology. He likens this to "going from zero to one".
 Extensive growth, which involves spreading existing technology to more people and making it faster, cheaper, and better. Globalization is an example of extensive growth. Thiel likens extensive growth to "going from 1 to N".

Thiel believes that too many people in business and philanthropy are focused on extensive growth and there is too little focus on intensive growth. Thiel thus concentrates most of his philanthropic efforts on efforts that he considers likely to lead to intensive growth, i.e., radical innovation. Breakout Labs is part of these efforts.  Many of these themes are also covered in his similarly titled book Zero to One.

Media coverage

The announcement of Breakout Labs (October 2011), as well as the announcements of its first batch of grantees (April 2012), received considerable media attention. The first and second batches of grantees were covered by TechCrunch. Breakout Labs was also covered in Nature and Scientific American.

References

External links
 

Grants (money)
Organizations established in 2012
Organizations based in San Francisco
Philanthropic organizations based in the United States
2012 establishments in California